The 71st Academy Awards ceremony, organized by the Academy of Motion Picture Arts and Sciences (AMPAS), honored the best of 1998 in film and took place on March 21, 1999, at the Dorothy Chandler Pavilion in Los Angeles beginning at 5:30 p.m. PST / 8:30 p.m. EST. During the ceremony, AMPAS presented Academy Awards (commonly referred to as Oscars) in 24 categories. The ceremony, televised in the United States by ABC, was produced by Gil Cates and directed by Louis J. Horvitz. Actress Whoopi Goldberg hosted the show for the third time. She first hosted the 66th ceremony held in 1994 and had last hosted the 68th ceremony in 1996. Nearly a month earlier in a ceremony held at the Regent Beverly Wilshire Hotel in Beverly Hills, California on February 27, the Academy Awards for Technical Achievement were presented by host Anne Heche.

Shakespeare in Love won seven awards, including Best Picture. Other winners included Saving Private Ryan with five awards, Life Is Beautiful with three, and Affliction, Bunny, Election Night, Elizabeth, Gods and Monsters, The Last Days, The Personals: Improvisations on Romance in the Golden Years, The Prince of Egypt, and What Dreams May Come with one. The telecast garnered nearly 46 million viewers in the United States.

Winners and nominees

The nominees for the 71st Academy Awards were announced on February 9, 1999, at the Samuel Goldwyn Theater in Beverly Hills, California, by Robert Rehme, president of the Academy, and the actor Kevin Spacey. Shakespeare in Love earned the most nominations with thirteen; Saving Private Ryan came in second place with eleven.

The winners were announced during the awards ceremony on March 21, 1999. Life Is Beautiful was the second film nominated simultaneously for Best Picture and Best Foreign Language Film in the same year (the first being Z in 1969). Moreover, its seven nominations were the most for a foreign language film, to date. Best Actor winner Roberto Benigni was the second person to direct himself to an acting Oscar win. Laurence Olivier first achieved this feat for his performance in 1948's Hamlet. He also became the fourth individual to earn acting, directing, screenwriting nominations for the same film. In addition, Benigni was the third performer to win an Oscar for a non-English speaking role. By virtue of their nominations for portraying Queen Elizabeth I of England, Best Actress nominee Cate Blanchett and Best Supporting Actress winner Judi Dench became the first pair of actresses to earn acting nominations in the same year for portraying the same character in different films.

Awards

Winners are listed first, highlighted in boldface, and indicated with a double dagger.

Academy Honorary Award
 Elia Kazan

Irving G. Thalberg Award
 Norman Jewison

Films with multiple nominations and awards
 
The following 19 films received multiple nominations:

The following three films received multiple awards:

Presenters and performers
The following individuals presented awards or performed musical numbers.

Presenters

Performers

Ceremony information

Riding on the success of the previous year's ceremony which garnered record-high viewership figures and several Emmys, AMPAS sought changes to the festivities that would help build upon this recent success. In June 1998, Academy president Robert Rehme announced that the show would be held on a Sunday for the first time in history. AMPAS and network ABC hoped to capitalize on the high television ratings and viewership that benefit programs airing on that particular day of the week. The Academy also stated that the move to Sunday would ease concerns about traffic gridlock and transportation that are significantly lower on weekends.

The following January, Gil Cates was selected as a producer of the telecast. He immediately selected Oscar-winning actress Whoopi Goldberg as host of the 1999 ceremony. Cates explained his decision to bring back Goldberg as host saying, "The audience adores Whoopi and that affection, plus Whoopi's extraordinary talent makes her a terrific host for the show." In a statement, Goldberg expressed that she was honored and excited to be selected to emcee the telecast commenting, "I am thrilled to escort Oscar into the new millennium. Who would have thought that I would be hosting the last Oscar telecast of the century? It's a huge deal."

Several other people participated in the production of the ceremony and its related events. Bill Conti served as musical director for the festivities. In addition to supervising the Best Song nominee performances, choreographer Debbie Allen produced a dance number featuring five dancers from around the world showcasing the nominees for Best Original Dramatic Score. For the first time, the Academy produced its own pre-show that preceded the main telecast. Produced by Dennis Doty, the half-hour program was hosted by actress Geena Davis and CNN reporter Jim Moret. Similar to coverage of red carpet arrivals on networks such as E!, the pre-show featured interviews with nominees and other guests, recaps of nominations and segments highlighting behind-the-scenes preparations for the telecast.

Box office performance of nominees
At the time of the nominations announcement on February 9, the combined gross of the five Best Picture nominees was $302 million with an average of $60.4 million per film. Saving Private Ryan was the highest earner among the Best Picture nominees with $194.2 million in domestic box office receipts. The film was followed by Shakespeare in Love ($36.5 million), The Thin Red Line ($30.6 million), Elizabeth ($21.5 million), and finally Life is Beautiful ($18.4 million).

Of the top 50 grossing movies of the year, 36 nominations went to 13 films on the list. Only Saving Private Ryan (2nd), The Truman Show (11th), A Civil Action (40th) and Primary Colors (50th) were nominated for Best Picture, directing, acting or screenwriting. The other top 50 box office hits that earned nominations were Armageddon (1st), A Bug's Life (5th), Patch Adams (12th), Mulan (13th), The Mask of Zorro (17th), The Prince of Egypt (18th), The Horse Whisperer (24th), What Dreams May Come (37th) and Pleasantville (49th).

Critical reviews
The show received a mixed reception from media publications. Columnist Lisa Schwarzbaum of Entertainment Weekly quipped that "Whoopi bombed last night, she knew it—and yet, crassly, she took it as a sign of her own outrageousness." The Washington Post television critic Tom Shales bemoaned that Goldberg "spent a great deal of time laughing at her own jokes, many of which were dirty, a few dirty." He also lambasted the host's presentation of the five Best Costume Design nominees saying calling it time-consuming and tasteless. Film critic John Hartl of The Seattle Times lamented that the telecast "was the longest and possibly the dullest Oscar show of the century, clocking in at four hours."

Other media outlets received the broadcast more positively. Television columnist Robert Bianco of USA Today commended Goldberg's hosting performance writing that he liked "the sharper, more socially conscious edge Goldberg brings." The Boston Globe television critic Matthew Gilbert commented, "It was the perfect year with more than enough Hollywood intrigue and a battle for her to play off." Joanne Ostrow of The Denver Post raved that "Whoopi definitely was on, more so than in her two previous hosting stints." She added that "the show was exceptionally smooth."

Ratings and reception
The American telecast on ABC drew an average of 45.51 million viewers over its length, which was an 18% decrease from the previous year's ceremony. An estimated 78.10 million total viewers watched all or part of the awards. The show also drew lower Nielsen ratings compared to the previous ceremony with 28.63% of households watching over a 47.79 share. It also drew a lower 1849 demo rating with an 18.85 rating over a 37.31 share among viewers in that demographic.

In July 1999, the show received seven nominations at the 51st Primetime Emmy Awards. Two months later, the ceremony won two of those nominations for Outstanding Art Direction for a Variety or Music Program (Roy Christopher and Stephen Olson) and Outstanding Lighting Direction for a Drama Series, Variety Series, Miniseries, Movie, or Special (Robert Dickinson, Robert T. Barnhart, Andy O'Reilly, Matt Ford).

In Memoriam
The annual In Memoriam tribute was presented by actress Annette Bening. The montage featured an excerpt of the main title from Ever After composed by George Fenton.

 Dane Clark – Character actor
 Linwood G. Dunn – Special Effects
 George W. Davis – Art Director
 Dick O'Neill – Actor
 Charles Lang – Cinematographer
 Norman Fell – Actor
 James Goldman – Screenwriter
 Vincent Winter – Child actor
 Freddie Young – Cinematographer
 John P. Veitch – Executive
 E. G. Marshall – Actor
 Jeanette Nolan – Actress
 Alan J. Pakula – Writer/Director/Producer
 Jerome Robbins – Director/Cinematographer
 Susan Strasberg – Actress
 John Derek – Actor
 John Addison – Composer
 Jean Marais – Actor
 Richard Kiley – Actor
 Maureen O'Sullivan – Actress
 Phil Hartman – Actor/comedian
 Esther Rolle – Actress
 Gene Raymond – Actor
 Binnie Barnes – Actress
 Valerie Hobson – Actress
 Huntz Hall – Child actor
 Akira Kurosawa – Director
 Alice Faye – Actress/singer
 Robert Young – Actor
 Roddy McDowall – Actor

A separate tribute to actor, singer and former Oscar host Frank Sinatra was presented by John Travolta. Later, actor Val Kilmer presented one to actors Gene Autry and Roy Rogers. After the In Memoriam segment was shown, host Goldberg and director Steven Spielberg eulogized film critic Gene Siskel and director Stanley Kubrick respectively.

See also

 5th Screen Actors Guild Awards
 19th Golden Raspberry Awards
 41st Grammy Awards
 51st Primetime Emmy Awards
 52nd British Academy Film Awards
 53rd Tony Awards
 56th Golden Globe Awards
 List of submissions to the 71st Academy Awards for Best Foreign Language Film

References

Bibliography

External links
Official websites
 Academy Awards Official website
 The Academy of Motion Picture Arts and Sciences Official website
 Oscar's Channel at YouTube (run by the Academy of Motion Picture Arts and Sciences)

News resources
 The Oscars 1999 BBC News

Analysis
 1998 Academy Awards Winners and History Filmsite
 Academy Awards, USA: 1999 Internet Movie Database

Other resources
 

1998 film awards
1999 in American cinema
Academy Awards ceremonies
1999 in Los Angeles
March 1999 events in the United States
Academy
Television shows directed by Louis J. Horvitz